Xiu Xiu (born 4 December 1987 in Luoyang, Henan) is a Chinese modern pentathlete who finished 10th in this event at the 2008 Summer Olympics in Beijing.

Her personal best at the World Championships is 5th at the 2007 World Championships. She also won the Korean Open & Asian Championships in 2009.

References

External links
 

1987 births
Living people
Chinese female modern pentathletes
Olympic modern pentathletes of China
Modern pentathletes at the 2008 Summer Olympics
Sportspeople from Luoyang
20th-century Chinese women
21st-century Chinese women